Simon Trumper (born 31 May 1963) is an English professional poker player from South Kensington, London, England. He is chiefly noted as the winner of Late Night Poker series 2 and runner-up of series 4. Trumper also commentated on the Late Night Poker Ace spin-off series alongside Jesse May.

As a child, Trumper was expelled from secondary school for playing poker dice after finishing a mathematics exam. He started playing in 1995 when he entered a £10 tournament in Reading with a friend on a night out. He was also bullied a lot due to his surname 'Trumper'.

At the World Series of Poker he has had a 4th-place finish in the 2002 $3,000 No Limit Hold-Em event, which also featured Johnny Chan and Kathy Liebert, and a 4th-place finish in the 2005 $10,000 Pot Limit Omaha event, which also featured Todd Brunson, Barry Greenstein (who lost a critical pot to Simon and then complained about it in his blog), Erik Seidel, and Julian "The Kid" Gardner. He has not yet featured in the World Poker Tour.

In May 2005, he reached the fourth round of the €2,000 World Heads-Up Championship, earning €3,250.

Trumper owns a pair of gold and diamond aces to cap his cards as a good luck charm. He admires Dave "The Devilfish" Ulliott, T. J. Cloutier and Erik Seidel above all other poker players.

He is a non-smoker, and would like to see smoking banned from all poker games. Trumper suffers from the hair loss condition, Alopecia.

As of 2018 he has had consistent success in events around the world and his total live tournament winnings exceed $1,550,000. He has three daughters and a son called Emma, Ben Kylie and Rebecca.

References

External links
 Official Site
 Trumper's Live Journal
 UK Betting folds its Aces
 UKPokerNews interview
 Blonde Poker Interview
 Simon Trumper Hendon Mob tournament results
 Simon Trumper Dusk Till Dawn History

1963 births
Poker players from London
Living people
Poker commentators
People from South Kensington